This is a list of African-American women in classical music. African-American women who are notable in various fields of classical music are listed here.

Composers 

Lettie Alston (born 1953), composer
Regina Harris Baiocchi (born 1956), composer, writer and educator
 Margaret Bonds (1913–1972), composer and pianist
Valerie Coleman, composer and flutist
Shirley Graham Du Bois (1896–1977), composer, author and activist
Helen Eugenia Hagan (1891–1964), composer and pianist
Nora Holt (1884–1974), composer, singer and music critic
 Betty Jackson King (1928–1994), composer, singer, pianist and educator
Cynthia Cozette Lee (born 1953), composer and librettist 
Tania León (born 1943), composer and educator
 Lena McLin (born 1928), composer, author, pastor and educator
Jessie Montgomery (born 1982), composer and chamber musician
 Dorothy Rudd Moore (born 1940), composer and educator
 Undine Smith Moore (1904–1989), composer, pianist and educator
Joyce Solomon Moorman (born 1946), composer and educator
 Nkeiru Okoye (born 1972), composer
 Julia Perry (1924–1979), composer and educator
 Zenobia Powell Perry (1908–2004), composer, activist and educator
 Evelyn La Rue Pittman (1910–1992), composer
Rosephanye Powell (born 1962), composer, singer and academic
 Florence Price (1887–1953), composer, pianist and educator
Irene Britton Smith (1907–1999), composer and educator

Conductors 

Kalena Bovell, African-American and Hispanic conductor
Eva Jessye (1895–1992), choral conductor, composer and educator
Nina Gamble Kennedy (born 1960), conductor, filmmaker, pianist and writer
Marsha Mabrey (born 1949), conductor, educator and violinist
Kay George Roberts (born 1950), conductor and educator

Educators 

 Harriet Gibbs Marshall (1868–1941), educator, writer and creator of the Washington Conservatory of Music and School of Expression 
Rebecca Walker Steele (1925–2019), educator, singer and choir director

Instrumentalists 

Velvet Brown, tuba player and educator
Ezinma (born 1991), violinist and composer
Nokuthula Ngwenyama (born 1976), violinist and composer
Ann Hobson Pilot (born 1943), harpist
Sonya Robinson (born 1959), violinist
Carolyn Utz (1913–2005), bassist and conductor

Opera singers
Adele Addison (born 1925), operatic soprano also performing in recitals and concerts
Roberta Alexander (born 1949), international operatic soprano
Betty Allen (1927–2009), mezzo-soprano who performed in concerts and operas from the 1950s and later served as an educator
Marian Anderson (1897–1993), singer of classical music and spirituals, including opera
Martina Arroyo (born 1936), major international operatic soprano
Kathleen Battle (born 1948), operatic soprano and concert performer
Harolyn Blackwell (born 1955), lyric coloratura soprano who has performed in many of the world's leading opera houses
Angel Blue (1984), operatic soprano and classical crossover artist
Angela Brown (born 1963), operatic soprano admired for performances of Verdi heroines
Débria Brown (1936–2001), operatic mezzo-soprano and educator
Janai Brugger (born 1983), operatic soprano performing in leading roles in several opera companies
Hazel Joan Bryant (1939–1983), actress, opera singer, director and playwright
Grace Bumbry (born 1937), leading mezzo-soprano of her generation
Karla Burns (1954–2021), operatic mezzo-soprano and actress
Alyson Cambridge (fl. 2000s), operatic soprano, classical and jazz concert singer and actress
Cynthia Clarey (born 1949), operatic soprano and mezzo-soprano and classical concert performer
Barbara Smith Conrad (1937–2017), operatic mezzo-soprano and educator
Michèle Crider (born 1959), international lirico spinto soprano appearing in leading opera houses
Clamma Dale (born 1948), international operatic soprano and concert performer acclaimed for her portrayal of Bess
Billie Lynn Daniel (fl. 1960s), operatic soprano best known for performing Clara in Porgy and Bess
Ellabelle Davis (1907–1960), operatic soprano remembered for performing Aida in the 1940s
Gloria Davy (1931–2012), operatic soprano and concert singer who settled in Switzerland
Mary Cardwell Dawson (1894–1962), musician, educator and founding director of the National Negro Opera Company
Mattiwilda Dobbs (1925–2015), coloratura soprano, early international African-American performer
Ruby Elzy (1908–1943), pioneering short-lived African-American operatic soprano
Lillian Evanti (1890–1967), classical concert performer and opera singer who gained fame in France
Maria Ewing (born 1950), operatic soprano and mezzo-soprano, classical and jazz concert performer
Cassandra Extavour (fl. 2000s), Canadian geneticist and classical soprano singer
Zelma Watson George (1903–1994), philanthropist, musician and opera singer
Gail Varina Gilmore (born 1950), gospel and mezzo-soprano opera singer, known for performing Kundry in Wagner's Parsifal
Denyce Graves (born 1964), operatic mezzo-soprano known for performing the title roles in Carmen and Samson and Delilah
Elizabeth Greenfield (c. 1820–1876), best known African-American concert singer of her times, also conductor and educator
Reri Grist (born 1932), major international coloratura soprano and concert performer
Cynthia Haymon (born 1958), soprano who has performed in opera and modern classical works
Barbara Hendricks (born 1948), operatic soprano and concert singer who has settled in Switzerland
Caterina Jarboro (1898–1986), pioneering African-American opera singer who performed the title role in Aida in 1933
Betty Jones (1930–2019), operatic spinto soprano who performed in the 1970s
Isola Jones (born 1949), mezzo-soprano opera singer and educator
Sissieretta Jones (c.1869–1933), successful classical soprano who performed for American presidents and the British royal family
Jonita Lattimore (fl. 1990s), soprano and educator who has performed in operatic roles and oratorio engagements
Marquita Lister (born 1961), operatic soprano known for performing Bess in Porgy and Bess as well as Aida and Salome
Marvis Martin (born 1956), operatic soprano best known for her concert performances and recitals
Myra Merritt (fl. 1980s), operatic soprano and educator
Abbie Mitchell (1884–1960), operatic soprano who performed Clara in the première of Porgy and Bess
Latonia Moore (born 1979), classical soprano who has performed with leading opera companies
Jessye Norman (1945–2019), celebrated dramatic soprano who performed leading roles in opera and sang in recitals
Ailyn Pérez (born 1979), operatic soprano known for her interpretation of Violetta, Mimi and Thaïs
Leontyne Price (born 1927), internationally acclaimed soprano at the Metropolitan Opera
Florence Quivar (born 1944), operatic mezzo-soprano who gave over 100 performance at the Metropolitan Opera
La Julia Rhea (1898–1992), pioneering African-American operatic soprano who performed in Chicago from 1937
Marie Selika Williams (1849–1937), coloratura soprano, the first African American to perform at the White House
Murial Smith (1923–1985), singer who starred in musical theatre and opera from the 1940s
Florence Cole Talbert (1890–1961), operatic soprano, music educator and musician
Shirley Verrett (1931–2010), operatic mezzo-soprano known for singing works of Verdi and Donizetti from the late 1960s
Felicia Weathers (born 1937), international soprano opera and concert singer
Camilla Williams (1919–2012), operatic soprano and educator who performed nationally and internationally
Ivory Winston (1911–1996), coloratura soprano, "Iowa's First Lady of Song"

Pianists 
Margaret Bonds (1913–1972), early composer and pianist
Valerie Capers (born 1935), classical and jazz pianist, and composer
Helen Eugenia Hagan (1891–1964), pianist, educator and composer 
Hazel Harrison (1883–1969), concert pianist
 Anne Gamble Kennedy (1920–2001), pianist, accompanist and educator
Nina Gamble Kennedy (born 1960), pianist, conductor, filmmaker and writer
Cornelia Lampton (1896-1928), pianist and educator
Margaret Patrick (1913–1994), member of the Ebony and Ivory duo
Philippa Schuyler (1931–1967), child prodigy, concert pianist and journalist

See also 

 Lists of women in music
 List of classic female blues singers

African-American classical musicians
Classical music lists
Women in classical music
Lists of African-American people
African-American women in classical music
Lists of women in music